The Nyuwathayi (Njuwathai) were an indigenous Australian people of the Cape York Peninsula of Queensland. 
They may have spoken the Yinwum language, based on their location, but there is no data.

Country

By the time Ursula McConnel did her ethnographic surveys in the late 1920s and 30s, it appeared that the Nyuwathai gathered with the Atjinuri and Yinwum at the Moreton Telegraph Station.

Notes

Citations

Sources

Aboriginal peoples of Queensland